DiProDB is a database designed to collect and analyse thermodynamic, structural and other dinucleotide properties.

See also
 Protein database (disambiguation)

References

External links
 Main site

Biological databases
DNA
Biophysics
Molecular structure